Hutton Roof is a hamlet and former civil parish, now in the parish of Mungrisdale, in the Eden district, in the county of Cumbria, England, near Penrith. In 1931 the parish had a population of 108. The civil parish of Mungrisdale, which is made up of eight hamlets including Hutton Roof, had a population of 297 in the 2011 United Kingdom census.

History 
In 1870–1872 it was described as a township in Greystoke parish, with a population of 169 people in 33 houses. From 1866 Hutton Roof was a separate civil parish until 1 April 1934 when the parish was abolished and merged with Mungrisdale.

See also

Listed buildings in Mungrisdale

References

External links
 Cumbria County History Trust: Hutton Roof (nb: provisional research only – see Talk page)

Hamlets in Cumbria
Former civil parishes in Cumbria
Mungrisdale